Eva Wilma Riefle Buckup Zarattini (14 December 1933 – 15 May 2021) was a Brazilian actress and dancer. Among her several roles, she starred in the 1950s Brazilian television series Alô, Doçura!.

Biography
Eva Wilma was born in São Paulo. Her father, Otto Riefle Jr, was a German metallurgist from the Black Forest region of Pforzheim near Stuttgart in southern Germany. He went to Brazil, more precisely to the city of Rio de Janeiro in 1929, at the age of 19, to work in a metallurgy firm. Eva Wilma's mother, Luísa Carp, was born in Buenos Aires, Argentina, she was the daughter of Ukrainian Jews from the city of Kiev who immigrated to Argentina. Eva's parents met in the city of São Paulo when Eva's father was transferred to the city, and her mother, after living in Buenos Aires, moved to Brazil. In 1956 she was awarded with Prêmio Saci.

She was married for 23 years to actor John Herbert, with whom she had two children, Vivian and John Jr. She later married actor Carlos Zara.

Death 
Eva Wilma died at the age of 87 in São Paulo, May 15, 2021, at the Albert Einstein Hospital, of ovarian cancer.

Filmography

References

External links

 Eva Wilma official website

1933 births
2021 deaths
Actresses from São Paulo
Brazilian people of German descent
Brazilian people of Argentine descent
Brazilian people of Ukrainian-Jewish descent
Brazilian television actresses
Brazilian female dancers
Deaths from cancer in São Paulo (state)
Deaths from ovarian cancer